bob hund is the Swedish band bob hunds first full-length studio album and second self-titled release. The album peaked at number 11 on the Swedish Albums Chart.

Track listing
(English translation within parentheses)
 "Allseende ögat" – 1:40 ("The All-Seeing Eye")
 "Mer än så kan ingen bli" – 4:21 ("More Than That, No One Can Be")
 "100 år" – 2:25 ("100 Years")
 "15 år bakåt och 15 år framåt" – 2:55 ("15 Years Back and 15 Years Forward")
 "En rikedom av sandkorn" – 6:05 ("A Wealth of Sand Grains")
 "Länge, länge" – 4:08 ("A Long, Long Time")
 "Ett gipsat löfte" – 3:31 ("A Promise in Plaster")
 "Det skulle vara lätt för mig att säga att jag inte hittar hem men det gör jag, tror jag" – 9:15 ("It Would Be Easy for Me to Say That I Can't Find My Way Home But I Can; I Think")
 "Den nollgradige" – 3:20 ("The One Being Zero Degrees")
 "Dur och moll om vartannat" – 5:59 ("Major and Minor Keys Alternating")

Personnel
 Mats Andersson - Drums
 John Essing - Guitar
 Mats Hellquist - Bass
 Jonas Jonasson - Synth, backing vocals
 Conny Nimmersjö — Guitar
 Thomas Öberg - Lead vocals

Charts

External links
bobhund - bob hund's official website
silence.se Website of Silence Records

References

1994 albums
Bob Hund albums